Ortospana (Greek: Ὀρτόσπάνα) or Cabura (Greek: Κάβουρα) was an ancient city of Bactriana, which there is good reason for supposing is identical with the modern town of Kabul.

History 
The name is written variously in ancient authors Ortospana or Ortospanum; the latter is the form adopted by Pliny. Three principal roads leading through Bactriana met at this place; hence the notice in Strabo of the ἡ ἐκ Βάκτρον τρίοδος. The three roads may be, the pass by Bamian, that of the Hindu Kush, and that from Anderab to Khawar.

See also 

 Paropamisadae

References

Sources 

 Karttunen, Klaus (2006). "Cabura". In Salazar, Christine F. (ed.). Brill's New Pauly. Brill Publishers. Retrieved 15 May 2022.
 Vaux, W. S. W. (1857). "Ortospana". In Smith, William (ed.). Dictionary of Greek and Roman Geography. Vol. 2: Iabadius–Zymethus. London: Walton and Maberly. pp. 497–498. 

Ancient cities